is a passenger railway station located in the city center of Kōchi, Kōchi Prefecture, Japan. It is operated by the Shikoku Railway Company (JR Shikoku). In front of the station is Kōchi-Ekimae Station, a tram stop on the Tosaden Kōtsū Sanbashi Line.

Lines

Station layout

Since the completion of the new station building and platforms on February 26, 2008, Kōchi Station has become a raised station with two island platforms served by four tracks.

It received the Landmark Prize at the seventh annual Japanese Railway Awards held by the Ministry of Land, Infrastructure, Transport and Tourism.

History
The station, one of the key stations of the Shikoku railway network, started operation on November 15, 1924.

Surrounding area
Kochi Tourist Information Center
Statue of the Three Warriors (Takeichi Hampeita, Sakamoto Ryoma, Nakaoka Shintaro)
Kochi Red Cross Hospital
Taiheiyo Gakuen High School)

See also
List of railway stations in Japan

References

External links

JR Shikoku official homepage 

Railway stations in Kōchi Prefecture
Railway stations in Japan opened in 1924
Kōchi